Warren Ybañez (born September 14, 1979) is a Filipino professional basketball player who last played for the Marikina Shoemasters of the Maharlika Pilipinas Basketball League (MPBL). He was drafted 27th overall by Coca-Cola in 2004.

He had stints in the Philippine Basketball Association, where he played for the Barako Bull Energy, in the ASEAN Basketball League, playing for the Philippine Patriots. Ybañez was an important piece to the team and a testament to that is him being awarded with the Finals MVP award in 2010.

External links
Player Profile
PBA-Online Profile

1979 births
Living people
ASEAN Basketball League players
Barako Bull Energy Boosters players
Basketball players from Cebu
Filipino men's basketball players
Philippine Patriots players
Point guards
Sportspeople from Cebu City
Cebuano people
Maharlika Pilipinas Basketball League players